The FAI Cup 2007 was the 87th staging of The Football Association of Ireland Challenge Cup or FAI Cup. It was the first FAI Cup to be sponsored by Ford.

The 2007 FAI Ford Cup officially kicked off in late April, when twenty clubs from the junior and intermediate leagues battled it out for the chance to face eircom League of Ireland opposition in the second round.

The ten winners of those ties were joined in the second round by the 22 eircom League of Ireland clubs.

The competition ran until early December, with the final taking place on 2 December 2007.

First round
Matches played on the weekend of Sunday, 22 April 2007.

Phoenix 5-1 College Corinthians

Cherry Orchard 	2-0  Villa F.C.

Mayfield United 	0-1 	St. Mochtas

Celbridge Town 	1-0 	Killester United

Drogheda Town 	0-1 	St. John Bosco

Fanad United 2-0  Bangor Celtic

Kildrum Tigers 	1-2  Malahide United

Douglas Hall 	2-1 	Crumlin United

Salthill Devon 	1-0 Avondale United

Tolka Rovers 3-1 Belgrove

Second round
Matches played on the weekend of Sunday, 17 June 2007. The draw took place on Thursday, 31 May 2007 and was made by Emma Byrne and Paddy McCaul, and televised live on RTÉ One.

Third round
Matches played on the weekend of Sunday, 19 August 2007. The draw took place on Thursday, 5 July 2007 and was made by David Flood and Steve Staunton, and televised live on RTÉ One.

Quarter-finals

Matches to be played weekend of Sunday, 23 September. The draw took place on Monday, 27 August 2007 and was made by David Flood and Ronnie Whelan, and televised live on RTÉ One.

Replays

Semi-finals
Matches to be played weekend of Sunday, 28 October. The draw took place on Wednesday, 10 October, and was made by Paddy McCaul and Kevin MacDonald and was televised live on RTÉ One.

Final

Player of the Round
{| class="wikitable" style="font-size:95%"
!Round
!Name
!Position
!Club
|-
|align="center"|1
|align="left"| John Lawlor
|Defender
|Malahide United
|-
|align="center"|2
|align="left"| Brendan Sweeney
|Midfielder
| Douglas Hall
|-
|align="center"|3
|align="left"| Daryl Kavanagh
|Striker
|Waterford United
|-
|align="center"|Quarter-Finals
|align="left"| Conor Sammon
|Striker
|UCD
|-
|}

References

External links
FAI Website

 
2007
2